The Beijing Lions are a professional arena football team based in Beijing, China. They are members of the China Arena Football League (CAFL). They won the China Bowl in 2016.

History
The Beijing Lions were one of the first six teams to play in the China Arena Football League. They finished the 2016 season with a perfect record of 6–0 and won the league title by beating the Qingdao Clipper 35–34 on a last second field goal in the first China Bowl. 
On October 20, 2017, it was announced that Stephon Marbury had reached an agreement to become the owner of the Lions.

Seasons

References

External links
 China Arena Football League official website

 
China Arena Football League teams
2016 establishments in China
Sport in Beijing
American football teams established in 2016